Tuskeego is an unincorporated community in Bloomington Township, Decatur County, Iowa, United States.

History
Tuskeego's population was 31 in 1902, and 32 in 1925.

References

Unincorporated communities in Decatur County, Iowa
Unincorporated communities in Iowa